Sukha Singh was a Sikh warrior from present-day Punjab, India. Kamboki near Amritsar. He was born to mother Bibi Haro and father Bhai Ladha.

Sikh Persecution

Punjab had gone through an era of Sikh persecution under the Mughal governor of Lahore, Zakriya Khan, from 1726 to 1745 A.D. 

In 1740, the governor of Lahore put Massa Ranghar or Musalal Khan, a Chaudhury of Mandiala, in charge of Harmandir Sahib (Golden Temple). Sikhs were not allowed to visit Harmandir Sahib or to take a dip in the holy waters of its tank (sarovar). Massa Ranghar persecuted the Sikhs and looted the shops and homes of Hindus. He watched dancing girls perform, drank alcohol and smoked shisha inside Harmandir Sahib.

News from Amritsar

Two residents of Amritsar, Tej Ram, a Hindu, and Bulaka Singh, took this news to a band of Khalsa in the deserts of Bikaner under the leadership of Sardar Sham Singh. Tej Ram and Bulaka Singh narrated their stories to the congregation of Sikhs. After listening, Sardar Mehtab Singh Bhangu volunteered to bring Massa Ranghar's head back to Bikaner. Another Sikh, Sukha Singh Kalsi (a Tarkhan) of Mari Kamboki also stood up and asked to accompany Mehtab Singh.

Both of the Sikhs disguised themselves as landlords (Chaudhries) bringing revenue to Amritsar. They rode across the desert and reached Damdama Sahib at Talwandi Sabo near Bathinda. They filled up bags of broken pottery pieces and made them look as if they were full of coins.

Revenge at Harmandir Sahib
On August 11, 1740 A.D. they dressed up as landlords from Patti and entered the city of Amritsar. They reached Harmandir Sahib and then tied their horses to the berry tree and went inside Harmandir Sahib carrying the bags. Massa Ranghar was smoking shisha and watching dancing girls. The Sikhs threw the bags under Massa's bed and said that they had come to pay the revenue. Massa bent downwards to have a look at the bags. Mehtab Singh immediately took his sword and slashed it at Massa's neck and instantly severed his head. Sukha Singh finished off the guards of Massa Ranghar. They put Massa's head in a bag and rode their horses back to Talwandi Sabo the same evening. The next day they reached Bikaner and presented Massa Ranghar's head on a spear to the congregation (Dal) of Sikhs.

Further struggle
Early in 1752, Ahmad Shah Durrani came out leading his third invasion into India and camped at Shahdara preparatory to an attack on the Punjab capital. A fierce action took place in which Sukkha Singh and his men died fighting to Durrani's troopsmen.

See also
Mehtab Singh Bhangu

References 

Sikh warriors
Ramgarhia people